The Goupitan Dam is an arch dam on the Wu River, a tributary of the Yangtze River in Guizhou Province, southwest of China. Constructions began on in 2003 and the first generator was operational in June 2009. All works were completed in 2011.

The dam is supplemented by the Goupitan shiplift, said to be the tallest boat lift in the world. Xinhua reported, on July 3, 2020, it would be complete by March 2021.

See also 

 List of power stations in China

References 

Hydroelectric power stations in Guizhou
Dams in China
Arch dams
Dams completed in 2011
Dams on the Wu River